Tamás László (born October 29, 1950) is a Hungarian architect and politician, who served as Mayor of the 15th district of Budapest between 2010 and 2014.

He joined Fidesz in 2004, becoming president of its local branch in the 15th district. László was a member of the National Assembly of Hungary for the 15th district since 2010. He was also a Member of Parliament from Fidesz National List from 2006 to 2010. He was a member of the Economic and Information Technology Committee from May 14, 2010 to March 26, 2012. He also worked in the Committee on Consumer Protection.

László was defeated by László Hajdu during the 2018 parliamentary election, thus lost his parliamentary seat. Thereafter, Tamás László unsuccessfully ran for the mayoral seat of the 15th district in the by-election held on 30 September 2018, but was defeated by Angéla Németh. László was replaced as president of the Fidesz 15th district branch in February 2019.

Personal life
He is married and has two children.

References

1950 births
Living people
Architects from Budapest
Fidesz politicians
Members of the National Assembly of Hungary (2006–2010)
Members of the National Assembly of Hungary (2010–2014)
Members of the National Assembly of Hungary (2014–2018)
Mayors of places in Hungary
Politicians from Budapest